Deni Khasanovich Gaisumov (born 6 February 1968) is a retired footballer who played 23 times for the Azerbaijan national team.

Career 
He was the captain of FC Terek Grozny one of only four Chechens and was named the division's best defender last season 2003 .

Honours 
 Won the Russian Cup 2003/04 with FC Terek Grozny.
 Russian First Division best defender: 2004.

Privates 
He holds Russian and Azerbaijan citizenship.

External links
CSKA Profile

1968 births
Living people
Azerbaijani footballers
FC Spartak Moscow players
Azerbaijan international footballers
FC Akhmat Grozny players
PFC CSKA Moscow players
Dubai CSC players
FC Sokol Saratov players
Expatriate footballers in Kazakhstan
Azerbaijani football managers
FC Akhmat Grozny managers
Russian Premier League players
Azerbaijani expatriate footballers
Russian expatriate sportspeople in Kazakhstan
Russian people of Chechen descent
Chechen people
UAE First Division League players
Russian football managers
Association football defenders